Berbers in the Netherlands are people of Berber descent living in the Netherlands. Berbers in the Netherlands are estimated to number 367,455 people and are mainly of Riffian-Berber descent.

Notable people
Oussama Assaidi
Abdelkader Benali
Khalid Boulahrouz
Ali Elkhattabi
Ahmed Aboutaleb
Ismaïl Aissati
Mounir El Hamdaoui
Rajae El Mouhandiz
Mohammed Bouyeri
Mohammed Benzakour
Abdel Malek El Hasnaoui
Zakaria Labyad

See also
Berbers
Berbers in Belgium
Moroccan-Dutch
Moroccan diaspora

References

 
Ethnic groups in the Netherlands
 
Muslim communities in Europe